For the 1963 Vuelta a España, the field consisted of 90 riders; 65 finished the race.

By rider

By nationality

References

1963 Vuelta a España
1963